Pennsylvania Plaza (Penn Plaza) is the office, entertainment, and hotel complex occupying and near the site of Pennsylvania Station in Midtown Manhattan, New York City. It is bounded by 31st Street to the south, Eighth Avenue to the west, 34th Street to the north, and Seventh Avenue to the west.

It includes the current Madison Square Garden and its Theater, opened in 1968; the current below-ground Pennsylvania Station; and the One Pennsylvania Plaza and Two Pennsylvania Plaza office buildings.

Other buildings around the complex use the Pennsylvania Plaza name as an alternate address, such as the 5 Penn Plaza office building on Eighth Avenue, to the northwest; the Pennsylvania Building at 225 West 34th Street (14 Penn Plaza), north of the station; and the Hotel Pennsylvania at 401 Seventh Avenue (15 Penn Plaza), east of the station. The numbering of the Penn Plaza addresses around the area does not follow a consistent pattern.

The Penn Plaza complex remains one of the most controversial in New York City history because it involved the destruction, beginning in 1963, of the original McKim, Mead and White–designed  Penn Station (1910), a revered piece of New York architecture. Its replacements were what architects and civic purists regard as mediocre office and entertainment structures.

The demolition of the first Penn Station led to the city's landmarks preservation movement and helped save another landmark of railway architecture, Grand Central Terminal.

With the sports arena and railroad station at its hub and 34th Street retailers (including Macy's) nearing the complex, Pennsylvania Plaza remains one of the busier transportation, business and retailing neighborhoods in Manhattan.

Tenants

 AMC Networks
 Compuware
 Cosentini Associates
 Fuse
 McGraw-Hill
 MSG Networks
 Schoology
Information Builders
WSP Global

References

 
Midtown Manhattan